John Clayton Taylor  (born 4 August 1930) is a British mathematical physicist. He is an Emeritus Professor of Mathematical Physics at the Department of Applied Mathematics and Theoretical Physics of the University of Cambridge and an Emeritus Fellow of Robinson College. He is the father of mathematician Richard Taylor.

Education
Taylor earned his PhD from the University of Cambridge in 1956, under the supervision of Richard J. Eden and Abdus Salam. His thesis was entitled Renormalisation and Related Topics in Quantum Field Theory.

Research 
Taylor has made contributions to quantum field theory and the physics of elementary particles. His contributions include: the discovery (also made independently by Lev Landau) of singularities in the analytical structure of the Feynman integrals for processes in quantum field theory, the PCAC nature of radioactive decay of the pion and the discovery in 1971 of the so-called Slavnov–Taylor identities, which control symmetry and renormalisation of gauge theories.

With various collaborators, in 1980 he discovered that real and virtual infrared divergences do not cancel in QCD as they do in QED. They also showed how these infrared divergences exponentiate. In addition, they contributed to the resummation programme in thermal QCD, simplifying the "hard" part of the effective action. Later, they studied complications arising from the non-polynomial nature of the QCD Hamiltonian in the (unitary) Coulomb gauge.

Books 
 Gauge Theories of Weak Interactions (1976)
 Hidden Unity in Nature's Laws (2001)
 Gauge Theories in the Twentieth Century (2001)

Awards and honours 
Taylor was elected a Fellow of the Royal Society (FRS) in 1981. His certificate of election reads:

References 

1930 births
Living people
Fellows of Robinson College, Cambridge
Fellows of the Royal Society
British mathematicians
British physicists